

References

External links
Information About Mongolian National Parks, Strictly reserved areas and nature reserves
Information about Altai Tavan Bogd national park and Altai mountains of Mongolia
Ministry of Nature, Environment and Tourism of Mongolia

 List
Mongolia
National parks
National parks